Cölbe is a municipality in Marburg-Biedenkopf district in Hesse, Germany.

Location 
Cölbe's municipal area lies on the southern edge of the Burgwald, a low mountain range and part of the Hessisches Bergland (Hessian Highland), and borders directly on the university city of Marburg to the south. The namesake constituent community is found on a bow in the river Lahn where it bends from its mainly easterly flow to a mainly southerly one.

Neighbouring communities 
Cölbe borders in the northwest on the town of Wetter, in the northeast on the town of Rauschenberg, in the east on the town of Kirchhain, in the south on the town of Marburg, and in the west on the community of Lahntal (all in Marburg-Biedenkopf).

Divisions 
The community consists of six constituent communities named Bernsdorf, Bürgeln, Cölbe, Reddehausen, Schönstadt and Schwarzenborn.

Coat of arms 
Cölbe's civic coat of arms might be described thus: Gules a bend argent surmounted by six hearts reversed gules in bend three and three.
Reversed hearts are also taken in heraldry as stylized testicles.

Clubs 
 Fußballverein 1927 Cölbe (football)
 Fröhlicher Kreis e.V. Cölbe ("Merry District")
 Turnverein 06 Cölbe e.V. (Gymnastics)
 Freiwillige Feuerwehr Cölbe – Bürgeln (Volunteer fire brigade)
 Schützenverein 1930/63 Cölbe e.V. (Shooting club)
 Männergesangsverein Cölbe 1878 e.V. (Men's singing club)
 Bläserchor 1901 Schönstadt e.V. (Brass Band)

Politics 

As of municipal elections on 26 March 2006, seats on municipal council are apportioned thus:

Partnerships 
  Kościerzyna, Poland

Sundry 

The Institute for Theoretical Geodesy in Bonn has ascertained that the European Union's centre point after the 2004 expansion lies at the coordinates . This spot is to be found within Cölbe's municipal limits, 895 m from the community's own centre point. Newer efforts delving into this question, however, have yielded different results, putting the EU's centre point at Kleinmaischeid in the Westerwald.

References

External links 
 
 Deutschlandradio Berlin: Reise zum Mittelpunkt Europas
 

Marburg-Biedenkopf